"Theme from S-Express" is an acid house song by British electronic dance music group S'Express, from their debut studio album, Original Soundtrack (1989), written and produced by Mark Moore and Pascal Gabriel. One of the landmarks of early acid house and late 1980s sampling culture, the single became an instant hit upon its release in April 1988, peaking at number one on the UK Singles Chart for two weeks. It fared less well in the United States, only reaching number 91 on the Billboard Hot 100, but reaching number one on the Billboard Hot Dance Club Play chart. It peaked at number 11 in Australia and number two in West Germany, France and the Netherlands.

Production
The song samples liberally from many other works, including heavy usage of Rose Royce's "Is It Love You're After", and TZ's "I Got the Hots for You", which provided the song's campy hook. The song made prominent use of the line "Drop that ghetto blaster" from the song "Tales of Taboo" by Karen Finley. The hi-hat is sampled from an aerosol spray. The track's "S express" refrain makes reference to the 42nd Street Shuttle, a line on the New York City Subway. The train sample used is of an InterCity 125. The cover artwork features a cutaway drawing of a British Rail Class 56, a contemporary freight locomotive. For the North American release, some spoken word samples had to be removed due to licensing issues, and were recreated by unnamed voice artists. The female vocalist is Michel'le.

Samples used
This is a list of samples used in "Theme from S-Express".

 Alfredo de la Fé – "Hot to Trot" from Alfredo, 1979 (LP)
 Crystal Grass – "Crystal World" from You're All I Ever Dreamed Of, 1974 (LP)
 Karen Finley – "Tales of Taboo" from Tales of Taboo, 1986 (12")
 Debbie Harry – "Feel the Spin" from Krush Groove soundtrack, 1985 (LP) [removed from U.S. version]
 Vocal sample by Laura Olsher from "The Martian Monsters" from Chilling, Thrilling Sounds of the Haunted House, 1964 (LP) [removed from U.S. version]
 Gil Scott-Heron and Brian Jackson – "The Bottle" from Winter in America, 1974 (LP) [removed from U.S. version]
 Ish Ledesma – "Scream for Daddy" from I Could Love You, 1986 (12")
 Peech Boys – "Don't Make Me Wait" from Life Is Something Special, 1983 (LP)
 Gene Roddenberry – "The Star Trek Dream" from The Star Trek Dream, 1976 (LP) [removed from U.S. version]
 Rose Royce – "Is It Love You're After" from Rose Royce IV: Rainbow Connection, 1979 (LP)
 Sam the Sham & The Pharaohs – "Oh That's Bad, No That's Good" from Oh That's Good, No That's Bad, 1967 (7") [removed from U.S. version]
 Stacey Q – "Two of Hearts" from Better Than Heaven, 1986 (LP) [removed from U.S. version]
 TZ – "I Got the Hots for You" from I Got the Hots for You, 1983 (12")
 Yazoo – "Situation" from Upstairs at Eric's, 1982 (LP)

Critical reception
Nancy Culp from Record Mirror named "Theme from S-Express" Single of the Week, adding, "Coming on all Seventies and Cerrone (who could forget 'Supernature'?) Mark Moore's S'Express follows on in fine Rhythm King tradition (can the label do no wrong, I ask myself?). You see, the reason these DJs are making such great dancefloor records is that they know what gets you in the groove, man! With this one, you can have a giggle while you dance, too! It has just the right amount of tack/trendy quota to make sure it follows 'Beat Dis' straight to the top." The magazine's James Hamilton wrote in his dance column, "London DJ Mark Moore leads the Seventies flares fashion with a Rose Royce/BT Express-type buzzing bass synth and hissing hi-hat drive 117-0bpm semi-instrumental, full of samples, quotes and sound effects in current Eighties style, a likely hit."

Impact and legacy
In 2020, The Guardian ranked the song at number 51 in their list of "The 100 greatest UK No 1s". They added,

"To watch Top of the Pops as 1987 gives way to 1988 is to watch the freaks taking over the asylum: after MARRS and Bomb the Bass’s earlier acid house hits, S-Express’s sample-heavy track affirmed the sound’s chart coronation, making the Stock Aitken Waterman stable look even more square, and stuck one in the eye of London’s throttlingly cool club scene with its euphoric, queer collage."

Track listings

 CD maxi
 "Theme from S-Express" – (3:55)
 "The Trip" (Microdot House Mix) – (5:41)
 "Theme from S-Express" (Herbal Tea Casualty Mix) – (8:05)

 7" single
 "Theme from S-Express" – (3:55)
 "The Trip" (Microdot House Mix) – (4:18)

 12" maxi, Europe 1
 "Theme from S-Express" – (5:58)
 "The Trip" (Microdot House Mix) – (5:40)
 "Theme from S-Express" – (3:55)

 12" maxi, Europe 2
 "Theme from S-Express" (Herbal Tea Casualty Mix)
 "The Trip" (Microdot House Mix) – (5:40)
 "Theme from S'Express" – (3:55)

 12" maxi, Canada & UK
 "Theme from S-Express" (12" U.S.A. Mix) – (5:53)
 "Theme from S-Express" (7" U.S.A. Mix) – (3:53)
 "The Trip" (Microdot House Mix) – (5:53)

 Cassette
 "Theme from S-Express" (7" U.S.A. Mix)
 "Theme from S-Express" (12" U.S.A. Mix)
 "The Trip"
 "Theme from S-Express" (7" U.S.A. Mix)
 "Theme from S-Express" (12" U.S.A. Mix)
 "The Trip"

 CD maxi - Theme From S-Express (The Return Trip) (1996 release)
 "Theme from S-Express" (Tony De Vit 7" Mix) – (4:04)
 "Theme from S-Express" (Aquarius 7" Mix) – (4:12)
 "Theme from S-Express" (Original Theme 7" Mix Plus-8) – (3:36)
 "Theme from S-Express" (Tony De Vit 12" Mix) – (8:51)
 "Theme from S-Express" (Aquarius 'Party On The Orient Express' Mix) – (7:36)
 "Theme from S-Express" (Carl Craig's Edited Birthday Surprise Mix) – (7:36)

Charts

Weekly charts

Year-end charts

Certifications

References

1988 songs
1988 debut singles
1996 singles
Capitol Records singles
European Hot 100 Singles number-one singles
Number-one singles in Greece
Number-one singles in Switzerland
S'Express songs
Songs written by Pascal Gabriel
UK Independent Singles Chart number-one singles
UK Singles Chart number-one singles
Ultratop 50 Singles (Flanders) number-one singles